The 1947–48 Southern Football League season was the 45th in the history of the league, an English football competition. A total of 18 clubs contested the league, including 16 clubs from previous season, and two new clubs, Lovells Athletic and Torquay United II. Merthyr Tydfil were champions, winning their first Southern League title. Eight Southern League clubs applied to join the Football League at the end of the season, but none were successful.

League table

Football League elections
Eight Southern League clubs applied to join the Football League, but all four League clubs were re-elected.

References

Southern Football League seasons
S